Huajimic is a small village in the municipality of La Yesca in the Mexican State of Nayarit. It was founded on March 19, 1610 as a mission by priest Franciscano Fray Francisco Barrios.

Climate

References

External links

Populated places in Nayarit